Acinar cell carcinoma of the pancreas, also acinar cell carcinoma, is a rare malignant exocrine tumour of the pancreas. It represents 5% of all exocrine tumours of the pancreas, making it the second most common type of pancreatic cancer. It is abbreviated ACC. It typically has a guarded prognosis.

Signs and symptoms

The disease is more common in men than women and the average age at diagnosis is about 60.
Symptoms are often non-specific and include weight loss. A classic presentation, found in around 15% of cases includes subcutaneous nodules (due to fat necrosis) and arthralgias, caused by release of lipase.

Pathology
ACC are associated with increased serum lipase and manifest in the classic presentation known as the Schmid triad (subcutaneous fat necrosis, polyarthritis, eosinophilia).

ACC are typically large, up to 10 cm, and soft compared to pancreatic adenocarcinoma, lacking its dense stroma. They can arise in any part of the pancreas.

Histomorphologically, the tumour resembles the cells of the pancreatic acini and, typically, have moderate granular cytoplasm that stain with both PAS and PASD.

Diagnosis
 

Light microscopy of an acinar cell carcinoma biopsy typically shows granular appearance. Immunohistochemistry is usually positive for trypsin, chymotrypsin and lipase. On genetic testing, altered genes/proteins are typically found for p53, SMAD4, APC, ARID1A and GNAS.

Treatment
ACC can be treated with a Whipple procedure or (depending on the location within the pancreas) with left partial resection of pancreas.

See also
Pancreatic cancer

References

Digestive system neoplasia
Pancreas disorders
Pancreatic cancer